Saudi Arabia first competed at the Asian Games in 1982 Asian Games in New Delhi.

Medal tables

*Red border color indicates tournament was held on home soil.

References